Antaeotricha semisignella is a moth in the family Depressariidae. It was described by Francis Walker in 1864. It is found in Amazonas, Brazil.

Adults are whitish, the forewings with two brownish dots in the disk, one before the middle, the other at two-thirds of the length. The hindwings are brownish.

References

Moths described in 1864
semisignella
Moths of South America